The Château de Gien is a historic manor in Gien, Loiret, Indre-et-Loire, Centre-Val de Loire, France.

History
It was built in the 15th century for Anne of France. Guests included King Francis I of France, King Henry II of France, Queen consort Catherine de' Medici, King Charles IX of France, Queen consort Anne of Austria and King Louis XIV of France.

It has belonged to the French government since 1823. During World War II, it was bombed in 1940 and later restored. It is home to a museum about hunting.

Architectural significance
It has been listed as an official monument since 1840.

References

Châteaux in Loiret
Monuments historiques of Centre-Val de Loire